The World Heads-Up Poker Championship (WHUPC) was an annual elimination-format poker tournament of heads-up no limit Texas hold'em matches. The tournament was co-created by Late Night Poker's Nic Szeremeta, PokerInEurope's Jon Shoreman, and gaming journalist Rich Geller.

The event has run from 2001 to 2010 and was held in Europe. Entry was open to all. Its success led to America's creation of the National Heads-Up Poker Championship.

From 2001 to 2003, the event was held at the Concord Card Casino, Vienna, Austria.
From 2004 to 2008, the event was held at the Grand Casino, Barcelona, Spain.
In 2009 and 2010, the event was held at the Victoria Casino, London, England.
The event did not return in 2011 and its website has not been updated since 2010.

The event was filmed each year for TV broadcast around the world. In 2010 the event was broadcast live via the Internet for the first time at PokerInEuropeLive.com with commentary provided by Mike Carlson, Pete Singleton, and Neil Channing.

Results

External links
 Official Site

Poker tournaments in Europe